If You may refer to:
 "If You...", a song by Italian singer Magic Box
 "If You" (Big Bang song)
 "If You" (NU'EST W song)
 "If You", a song by Megan McKenna from the album Story of Me